The Rothschild family is a wealthy Ashkenazi Jewish family originally from Frankfurt that rose to prominence with Mayer Amschel Rothschild (1744–1812), a court factor to the German Landgraves of Hesse-Kassel in the Free City of Frankfurt, Holy Roman Empire, who established his banking business in the 1760s. Unlike most previous court factors, Rothschild managed to bequeath his wealth and established an international banking family through his five sons, who established businesses in London, Paris, Frankfurt, Vienna, and Naples. The family was elevated to noble rank in the Holy Roman Empire and the United Kingdom. The family's documented history starts in 16th century Frankfurt; its name is derived from the family house, Rothschild, built by Isaak Elchanan Bacharach in Frankfurt in 1567.

During the 19th century, the Rothschild family possessed the largest private fortune in the world, as well as in modern world history. The family's wealth declined over the 20th century, and was divided among many descendants. Today, their interests cover a diverse range of fields, including financial services, real estate, mining, energy, agriculture, winemaking, and nonprofits. Many examples of the family's rural architecture exist across northwestern Europe. The Rothschild family has frequently been the subject of conspiracy theories, many of which have antisemitic origins.

Overview

The first member of the family who was known to use the name "Rothschild" was Isaak Elchanan Rothschild, born in 1577. The name is derived from the German zum rothen Schild (with the old spelling "th"), meaning "at the red shield", in reference to the house where the family lived for many generations (in those days, houses were designated not by numbers, but by signs displaying different symbols or colours). A red shield can still be seen at the centre of the Rothschild coat of arms. The family's ascent to international prominence began in 1744, with the birth of Mayer Amschel Rothschild in Frankfurt am Main, Germany. He was the son of Amschel Moses Rothschild (born circa 1710), a money changer who had traded with the Prince of Hesse. Born in the "Judengasse", the ghetto of Frankfurt, Mayer developed a finance house and spread his empire by installing each of his five sons in the five main European financial centres to conduct business. The Rothschild coat of arms contains a clenched fist with five arrows symbolising the five dynasties established by the five sons of Mayer Rothschild, in a reference to Psalm 127: "Like arrows in the hands of a warrior, so are the children of one's youth." The family motto appears below the shield: Concordia, Integritas, Industria (Unity, Integrity, Industry).

Paul Johnson writes "[T]he Rothschilds are elusive. There is no book about them that is both revealing and accurate. Libraries of nonsense have been written about them... A woman who planned to write a book entitled Lies about the Rothschilds abandoned it, saying: 'It was relatively easy to spot the lies, but it proved impossible to find out the truth.'" Johnson writes that, unlike the court factors of earlier centuries, who had financed and managed European noble houses, but often lost their wealth through violence or expropriation, the new kind of international bank created by the Rothschilds was impervious to local attacks. Their assets were held in financial instruments, circulating through the world as stocks, bonds and debts. Changes made by the Rothschilds allowed them to insulate their property from local violence: "Henceforth their real wealth was beyond the reach of the mob, almost beyond the reach of greedy monarchs." Johnson argued that their fortune was generated to the greatest extent by Nathan Mayer Rothschild in London; however, more recent research by Niall Ferguson indicates that greater and equal profits also were realised by the other Rothschild dynasties, including James Mayer de Rothschild in Paris, Carl Mayer von Rothschild in Naples and Amschel Mayer Rothschild in Frankfurt.

Another essential part of Mayer Rothschild's strategy for success was to keep control of their banks in family hands, allowing them to maintain full secrecy about the size of their fortunes. In about 1906, the Jewish Encyclopedia noted: "The practice initiated by the Rothschilds of having several brothers of a firm establish branches in the different financial centres was followed by other Jewish financiers, like the Bischoffsheims, Pereires, Seligmans, Lazards and others, and these financiers by their integrity and financial skill obtained credit not alone with their Jewish confrères, but with the banking fraternity in general. By this means, Jewish financiers obtained an increasing share of international finance during the middle and last quarter of the 19th century. The head of the whole group was the Rothschild family..." It also says: "Of more recent years, non-Jewish financiers have learned the same cosmopolitan method, and, on the whole, the control is now rather less than more in Jewish hands than formerly."
Mayer Rothschild successfully kept the fortune in the family with carefully arranged marriages, often between first- or second-cousins (similar to royal intermarriage). By the late 19th century, however, almost all Rothschilds had started to marry outside the family, usually into the aristocracy or other financial dynasties.
His sons were:
 Amschel Mayer Rothschild (1773–1855): Frankfurt, died childless as his fortune passed to the sons of Salomon and Kalman
 Salomon Mayer Rothschild (1774–1855): Vienna
 Nathan Mayer Rothschild (1777–1836): London
  Kalman Mayer Rothschild (1788–1855): Naples
 Jakob Mayer Rothschild (1792–1868): Paris

The German family name "Rothschild" is pronounced  in German, unlike  in English. The surname "Rothschild" is rare in Germany.

Families by country:
 Rothschild banking family of Austria
 Rothschild banking family of England
 Rothschild banking family of Naples
 Rothschild banking family of France

The five sons of Mayer Amschel Rothschild were elevated to the Austrian nobility by Emperor Francis I of Austria, and they were all granted the Austrian hereditary title of Freiherr (baron) on 29 September 1822. The British branch of the family was elevated by Queen Victoria, who granted the hereditary title of baronet (1847) and later the hereditary peerage title of Baron Rothschild (1885).

The Napoleonic Wars 

The Rothschilds already possessed a significant fortune before the start of the Napoleonic Wars (1803–1815), and the family had gained preeminence in the bullion trade by this time. From London in 1813 to 1815, Nathan Mayer Rothschild was instrumental in almost single-handedly financing the British war effort, organising the shipment of bullion to the Duke of Wellington's armies across Europe, as well as arranging the payment of British financial subsidies to their continental allies. In 1815 alone, the Rothschilds provided £9.8 million (equivalent to about £ million in ) in subsidy loans to Britain's continental allies.

The brothers helped coordinate Rothschild activities across the continent, and the family developed a network of agents, shippers and couriers to transport gold across war-torn Europe. The family network was also to provide Nathan Rothschild time and again with political and financial information ahead of his peers, giving him an advantage in the markets and rendering the house of Rothschild still more invaluable to the British government.

In one instance, the family network enabled Nathan to receive in London the news of Wellington's victory at the Battle of Waterloo a full day ahead of the government's official messengers. Rothschild's first concern on this occasion was not to the potential financial advantage on the market which the knowledge would have given him; he and his courier immediately took the news to the government. That he used the news for financial advantage was a fiction then repeated in later popular accounts, such as that of Morton. The basis for the Rothschilds' most famously profitable move was made after the news of British victory had been made public. Nathan Rothschild calculated that the future reduction in government borrowing brought about by the peace would create a bounce in British government bonds after a two-year stabilisation, which would finalise the post-war restructuring of the domestic economy. In what has been described as one of the most audacious moves in financial history, Nathan immediately bought up the government bond market, for what at the time seemed an excessively high price, before waiting two years, then selling the bonds on the crest of a short bounce in the market in 1817 for a 40% profit. Given the sheer power of leverage the Rothschild family had at their disposal, this profit was an enormous sum.

Nathan Mayer Rothschild started his business in Manchester in 1806 and gradually moved it to London, where in 1809 he acquired the location at 2 New Court in St. Swithin's Lane, City of London, where it operates today; he established N M Rothschild & Sons in 1811. In 1818, he arranged a £5 million (equal to £ million in ) loan to the Prussian government, and the issuing of bonds for government loans formed a mainstay of his bank's business. He gained a position of such power in the City of London that by 1825–26 he was able to supply enough coin to the Bank of England to enable it to avert a market liquidity crisis.

International high finance 

Rothschild family banking businesses pioneered international high finance during the industrialisation of Europe and were instrumental in supporting railway systems across the world and in complex government financing for projects such as the Suez Canal. From 1895 through 1907 they loaned nearly $450,000,000 to European governments. During the 19th century, the family bought up a large proportion of the property in Mayfair, London.

The Rothschild family was directly involved in the independence of Brazil from Portugal in the early 19th century. Upon an agreement, the Brazilian government should pay a compensation of two million pounds sterling to the Kingdom of Portugal to accept Brazil's independence. N M Rothschild & Sons was pre-eminent in raising this capital for the government of the newly formed Empire of Brazil on the London market. In 1825, Nathan Rothschild raised £2,000,000, and indeed was probably discreetly involved in the earlier tranche of this loan which raised £1,000,000 in 1824. Part of the price of Portuguese recognition of Brazilian independence, secured in 1825, was that Brazil should take over repayment of the principal and interest on a £1,500,000 loan made to the Portuguese government in 1823 by N M Rothschild & Sons. A correspondence from Samuel Phillips & Co. in 1824 suggests the close involvement of the Rothschilds in the occasion.

Major 19th-century businesses founded with Rothschild family capital include:
 Alliance Assurance (1824) (now Royal & Sun Alliance)
 Chemin de Fer du Nord (1845)
 The Rio Tinto mining company (1873) (from the 1880s onwards, the Rothschilds had full control of Rio Tinto)
 Eramet (1880)
 Imerys (1880)
 De Beers (1888)

The family funded Cecil Rhodes in the creation of the African colony of Rhodesia. From the late 1880s onwards, the family took over control of the Rio Tinto mining company.

The Japanese government approached the London and Paris families for funding during the Russo-Japanese War. The London consortium's issue of Japanese war bonds would total £11.5 million (at 1907 currency rates; £ in 2012 currency terms).

The name of Rothschild became synonymous with extravagance and great wealth; and the family was renowned for its art collecting, for its palaces, as well as for its philanthropy. By the end of the century, the family owned, or had built, at the lowest estimates, over 41 palaces, of a scale and luxury perhaps unparalleled even by the richest royal families. The British Chancellor of the Exchequer David Lloyd George claimed, in 1909, that Nathan, Lord Rothschild was the most powerful man in Britain.

Niles' Weekly Register, Volume 49 had the following to say about the Rothschilds influence on international high finance in 1836:

Changes to family fortunes
The Neapolitan Rothschilds was the first branch of the family to decline when revolution broke out and Giuseppe Garibaldi captured Naples on 7 September 1860 and set up a provisional Italian government. Because of the family's close political connections with Austria and France,  was caught in a delicate position. He chose to take temporary sanctuary in Gaeta with the last Neapolitan king, Francis II of the Two Sicilies. However, the Rothschild branches in London, Paris, and Vienna were not prepared nor willing to financially support the deposed king. With the ensuing unification of Italy, and the mounting tension between Adolph and the rest of the family, the Naples house closed in 1863 after forty-two years in business.

In 1901, the German branch closed its doors after more than a century in business following the death of Wilhelm Rothschild with no male heirs. It was not until 1989 that the family returned to Germany, when N M Rothschild & Sons, the British branch, plus Bank Rothschild AG, the Swiss branch, set up a representative banking office in Frankfurt.

By the start of the 20th century, the introduction of national taxation systems had ended the Rothschilds' policy of operating with a single set of commercial account records, which resulted in the various branches gradually going their own separate ways as independent banks. The system of the five brothers and their successor sons all but disappeared by World War I.

The rise of Nazi Germany in the 1930s led to a precarious situation for the Austrian Rothschilds under the annexation of Austria in 1937 when the family was pressured to sell its banking operation at a fraction of its real worth. While other Rothschilds had escaped the Nazis, Louis Rothschild was imprisoned for a year and only released after a substantial ransom was paid by his family. After Louis was allowed to leave the country in March 1939, the Nazis placed the firm of S M von Rothschild under compulsory administration. Nazi officers and senior staff from Austrian museums also emptied the Rothschild family estates of all their valuables. Following the war, the Austrian Rothschilds were unable to reclaim much of their former assets and properties.

Later, the fall of France during the Second World War led to the seizure of the property of the French Rothschilds under German occupation. Despite having their bank restored to them at the end of the war, the French Rothschilds were powerless in 1982 as the family business was nationalised by the socialist government of newly elected President François Mitterrand.

In addition, The New York Times wrote that the Rothschilds "grossly misjudged the opportunities directly across the Atlantic" and quoted Evelyn Robert de Rothschild as saying that despite the accomplishments made by the various branches of the family in international high finance for over 200 years, "we never seized the initiative in America and that was one of the mistakes my family made."

Hereditary titles
In 1816, four of the five sons of Mayer Amschel Rothschild were elevated to the Austrian nobility by Emperor Francis I of Austria. The remaining son, Nathan, was elevated in 1818. All of them were granted the Austrian hereditary title of Freiherr (baron) on 29 September 1822. As a result, some members of the family used the nobiliary particle de or von before their surname to acknowledge the grant of nobility.

In 1847, Anthony de Rothschild was made a hereditary baronet of the United Kingdom. In 1885, Sir Nathan Rothschild, 2nd Baronet, was granted the hereditary peerage title of Baron Rothschild in the Peerage of the United Kingdom. This title is currently held by the 4th Baron Rothschild.

English branch 

The Rothschild banking family of England was founded in 1798 by Nathan Mayer Rothschild (1777–1836), who first settled in Manchester but then moved to London. Nathan Mayer von Rothschild, the third son of Mayer Amschel Rothschild (1744–1812), first established a textile jobbing business in Manchester and from there went on to establish N M Rothschild & Sons bank in London.

During the early part of the 19th century, the Rothschild family's London bank took a leading part in managing and financing the subsidies that the British government transferred to its allies during the Napoleonic Wars. Through the creation of a network of agents, couriers and shippers, the bank was able to provide funds to the armies of the Duke of Wellington in Portugal and Spain, therefore funding the war. The providing of other innovative and complex financing for government projects formed a mainstay of the bank's business for the better part of the century. N M Rothschild & Sons' financial strength in the City of London became such that, by 1825–26, the bank was able to supply enough coin to the Bank of England to enable it to avert a liquidity crisis.

Nathan Mayer's eldest son, Lionel de Rothschild (1808–1879), succeeded him as head of the London branch. Under Lionel, the bank financed the British government's 1875 purchase of Egypt's interest in the Suez Canal. The Rothschild bank also funded Cecil Rhodes in the development of the British South Africa Company. Leopold de Rothschild (1845–1917) administered Rhodes's estate after his death in 1902 and helped to set up the Rhodes Scholarship scheme at the University of Oxford. In 1873, de Rothschild Frères in France and N M Rothschild & Sons of London joined with other investors to acquire the Spanish government's money-losing Rio Tinto copper mines. The new owners restructured the company and turned it into a profitable business. By 1905, the Rothschild interest in Rio Tinto amounted to more than 30 percent. In 1887, the French and British Rothschild banking houses loaned money to, and invested in, the De Beers diamond mines in South Africa, becoming its largest shareholders.

The London banking house continued under the management of Lionel Nathan de Rothschild (1882–1942) and his brother Anthony Gustav de Rothschild (1887–1961), and then to Sir Evelyn de Rothschild (1931–2022). In 2003, following Sir Evelyn's retirement as head of N M Rothschild & Sons of London, the British and French financial firms merged under the leadership of David René de Rothschild.

French branches 

There are two branches of the family connected to France.

The first was the branch of James Mayer de Rothschild (1792–1868), known as "James", who established de Rothschild Frères in Paris; he married his niece Betty von Rothschild. Following the Napoleonic Wars, he played a major role in financing the construction of railways and the mining business that helped make France an industrial power. By 1980, the Paris business employed about 2,000 people and had an annual turnover of 26 billion francs (€4.13 billion or $5 billion in the currency rates of 1980).

However, the Paris business suffered a near death blow in 1982, when the socialist government of François Mitterrand nationalised and renamed it as Compagnie Européenne de Banque. Baron David de Rothschild, then 39, decided to stay and rebuild, creating a new entity named Rothschild & Cie Banque, with just three employees and €830,000 (US$1 million) in capital. Today, the Paris operation has 22 partners and accounts for a significant part of the global business.

Ensuing generations of the Paris Rothschild family remained involved in the family business, becoming a major force in international investment banking. The Paris Rothschilds have since led the Thomson Financial League Tables in Investment Banking Merger and Acquisition deals in the UK, France and Italy.

James Mayer de Rothschild's other son, Edmond James de Rothschild (1845–1934), was very much engaged in philanthropy and the arts, and he was a leading proponent of Zionism. His grandson, Baron Edmond Adolphe de Rothschild, founded in 1953 the LCF Rothschild Group, a private bank. Since 1997, Baron Benjamin de Rothschild chairs the group. The group has €100bn of assets in 2008 and owns many wine properties in France (Château Clarke, Château des Laurets), in Australia or in South Africa. In 1961, the 35-year-old Edmond Adolphe de Rothschild purchased the company Club Med, after he had visited a resort and enjoyed his stay. His interest in Club Med was sold off by the 1990s. In 1973, he bought out the Bank of California, selling his interests in 1984 before it was sold to Mitsubishi Bank in 1985.

The second French branch was founded by Nathaniel de Rothschild (1812–1870). Born in London, he was the fourth child of the founder of the British branch of the family, Nathan Mayer Rothschild (1777–1836). In 1850 Nathaniel Rothschild moved to Paris to work with his uncle James Mayer Rothschild. In 1853 Nathaniel acquired Château Brane Mouton, a vineyard in Pauillac in the Gironde département.  Nathaniel Rothschild renamed the estate Château Mouton Rothschild, and it would become one of the best known labels in the world. In 1868, Nathaniel's uncle, James Mayer de Rothschild, acquired the neighbouring Château Lafite vineyard.

Austrian branch 

In Vienna, Salomon Mayer Rothschild established a bank in the 1820s and the Austrian family had vast wealth and position. The crash of 1929 brought problems, and Baron Louis von Rothschild attempted to shore up the Creditanstalt, Austria's largest bank, to prevent its collapse. Nevertheless, during the Second World War they had to surrender their bank to the Nazis and flee the country. Their Rothschild palaces, a collection of vast palaces in Vienna built and owned by the family, were confiscated, plundered and destroyed by the Nazis. The palaces were famous for their sheer size and for their huge collections of paintings, armour, tapestries and statues (some of which were restored to the Rothschilds by the Austrian government in 1999). All family members escaped the Holocaust, some of them moving to the United States, and returning to Europe only after the war. In 1999, the government of Austria agreed to return to the Rothschild family some 250 art treasures looted by the Nazis and absorbed into state museums after the war.

Neapolitan branch 

The C M de Rothschild & Figli bank arranged substantial loans to the Papal States and to various Kings of Naples plus the Duchy of Parma and the Grand Duchy of Tuscany. However, in the 1830s, Naples followed Spain with a gradual shift away from conventional bond issues that began to affect the bank's growth and profitability. The Unification of Italy in 1861, with the ensuing decline of the Italian aristocracy who had been the Rothschild's primary clients, eventually brought about the closure of their Naples bank, due to a forecasted decline in the sustainability of the business over the long-term. However, in the early 19th century, the Rothschild family of Naples built up close relations with the Holy See, and the association between the family and the Vatican continued into the 20th century. In 1832, when Pope Gregory XVI was seen meeting Carl von Rothschild to arrange the 1832 Rothschild loan to the Holy See (for £400,000, worth €43,000,000 in 2014), observers were shocked that Rothschild was not required to kiss the Pope's feet, as was then required for all other visitors to the Pope, including monarchs. The 1906 Jewish Encyclopedia described the Rothschilds as "the guardians of the papal treasure".

Jewish identity and positions on Zionism 
Jewish solidarity in the family was not homogeneous. Many Rothschilds were supporters of Zionism, while other members of the family opposed the creation of the Jewish state.  In 1917 Walter Rothschild, 2nd Baron Rothschild was the addressee of the Balfour Declaration to the Zionist Federation, which committed the British government to the establishment in Palestine of a national home for the Jewish people. His nephew, Victor, Lord Rothschild was against granting asylum or helping Jewish refugees in 1938.

After the death of James Jacob de Rothschild in 1868, his eldest son Alphonse Rothschild took over the management of the family bank and was the most active in support for Eretz Israel. The Rothschild family archives show that during the 1870s the family contributed nearly 500,000 francs per year on behalf of Eastern Jewry to the Alliance Israélite Universelle.

Baron Edmond James de Rothschild (known in Israel simply as "the Baron Rothschild" or "the Benefactor" (Hebrew: "HaNadiv"), youngest son of James Jacob de Rothschild, was a patron of the first permanent settlement in Palestine at Rishon-LeZion (1882). He also provided funding for the establishment of Petah Tikva as a permanent settlement (1883). Overall, he bought from Ottoman landlords 2–3% of the land which now makes up present-day Israel. After Baron de Hirsch died in 1896, the Hirsch-founded Jewish Colonisation Association (ICA) started supporting the settlement of Palestine (1896), and Baron Rothschild took an active role in the organization and transferred his Palestinian land holdings as well as 15 million francs to it. In Tel Aviv, the Rothschild Boulevard is named after him, as are a number of localities throughout Israel which he assisted in founding, including Metulla, Zikhron Ya'akov, Rishon Lezion and Rosh Pina. A park in Boulogne-Billancourt, Paris, the Parc Edmond de Rothschild (Edmond de Rothschild Park), is also named after its founder. The Rothschilds also played a significant part in the funding of Israel's governmental infrastructure. James A. de Rothschild financed the Knesset building as a gift to the State of Israel and the Supreme Court of Israel building was donated to Israel by Dorothy de Rothschild. Outside the President's Chamber is displayed the letter Dorothy de Rothschild wrote to then Prime Minister Shimon Peres expressing her intention to donate a new building for the Supreme Court.

Interviewed by Haaretz in 2010, Baron Benjamin Rothschild, a Swiss-based member of the banking family, said that he supported the Israeli–Palestinian peace process: "I understand that it is a complicated business, mainly because of the fanatics and extremists – and I am talking about both sides. I think you have fanatics in Israel. ... In general I am not in contact with politicians. I spoke once with Netanyahu. I met once with an Israeli finance minister, but the less I mingle with politicians the better I feel." Due to a dispute with the Israeli tax authorities, the baron refuses to visit Israel. But his wife Ariane de Rothschild often visits Israel where she manages the Caesarea Foundation. She says: "It is insulting that the state [Israel] casts doubt on us. If there is a family that does not have to prove its commitment to Israel, it's ours."

Places in Israel named after Rothschild family members

Primarily due to the generosity and influence of Baron Edmond James de Rothschild, HaNadiv (the Benefactor), on the history of the Land of Israel and the State of Israel, a tradition exists of naming cities, towns and other settlements in Israel in honor of members of the Rothschild family. Six of these places are grouped in the same vicinity, on the Sharon plain, while the others are scattered throughout the country. They are, listed in order of founding:

 Zichron Ya'akov (Hebrew: Jacob's Memory), a town founded in 1882 and named after the Benefactor's father, James [Jacob] Mayer de Rothschild (1792–1868) from the Paris branch of the family;
 Mazkeret Batya (Hebrew: Remembrance of Batya), a local council near Tel Aviv, founded in 1883 and named after Betty von Rothschild (1805–1886), the Benefactor's mother;
 Bat Shlomo (Hebrew: Salomon's Daughter), a moshav near Rehovot, founded in 1889 and also named after the Baron's mother, who was the daughter of Salomon Mayer von Rothschild (1774–1855), the Benefactor's grandfather from the Vienna branch;
 Meir Shfeya (Hebrew: Mayer's Fields), a youth village near Zichron Ya'acov, founded as a moshava in 1891 and named after Amschel Mayer von Rothschild (1773–1855), the Benefactor's grandfather from the Frankfurt branch;
 Givat Ada (Hebrew: Ada's Hill), a town near Zichron Ya'acov, founded in 1903 and named after the Benefactor's wife Adelheid von Rothschild (1853–1935), who was also his cousin, from the Naples branch;
 Binyamina, a town near Zichron Ya'acov, founded in 1922 and named after Benefactor himself (Binyamina was officially merged with Givat Ada in 2003);
 Ashdot Ya'akov (Hebrew: Jacob's Rapids), a kibbutz just south of the Sea of Galilee, founded in 1924 and named after James Armand Edmond de Rothschild (1878–1957), son of the Benefactor;
 Pardes Hanna (Hebrew: Hannah's [Citrus] Orchard), a local council near Zichron Ya'acov, founded in 1929 and named after Hannah Primrose, Countess of Rosebery née de Rothschild (1851–1890), daughter of Mayer Anschel Rothschild;
 Shadmot Dvora (Hebrew: Deborah's Cultivated Fields), a moshav near Tiberias, founded in 1939 and named after Dorothy de Rothschild (1895–1988), who was James de Rothschild's wife and the Benefactor's daughter-in-law;
 Sde Eliezer (Hebrew: Eliezer's Field), a moshav in the Hula Valley, founded in 1950 and named after Robert Rothschild (1911–1998), a relative of the Benefactor's of the French branch.

Modern businesses, investments, and philanthropy 

Since the late 19th century, the family has taken a low-key public profile, donating many famous estates, as well as vast quantities of art, to charity, and generally eschewing conspicuous displays of wealth. Today, Rothschild businesses are on a smaller scale than they were throughout the 19th century, although they encompass a diverse range of fields, including: real estate, financial services, mixed farming, energy, mining, winemaking and nonprofits.

The Rothschild Group

Since 2003, a group of Rothschild banks have been controlled by Rothschild Continuation Holdings, a Swiss-registered holding company (under the chairmanship of Baron David René de Rothschild). Rothschild Continuation Holdings is in turn controlled by Concordia BV, a Dutch-registered master holding company. Concordia BV is managed by Paris Orléans S.A., a French-registered holding company. Paris Orléans S.A. is ultimately controlled by Rothschild Concordia SAS, a Rothschild's family holding company. Rothschild & Cie Banque controls Rothschild banking businesses in France and continental Europe, while Rothschilds Continuation Holdings AG controls a number of Rothschild banks elsewhere, including N M Rothschild & Sons in London. Twenty percent of Rothschild Continuation Holdings AG was sold in 2005 to Jardine Strategic, which is a subsidiary of Jardine, Matheson & Co. of Hong Kong. In November 2008, Rabobank Group, the leading investment and private bank in the Netherlands, acquired 7.5% of Rothschild Continuation Holdings AG, and Rabobank and Rothschild entered into a co-operation agreement in the fields of mergers and acquisitions (M&A) advisory and equity capital markets advisory in the food and agribusiness sectors. It was believed that the move was intended to help Rothschild Continuation Holdings AG gain access to a wider capital pool, enlarging its presence in East Asian markets.

Paris Orléans S.A. is a financial holding company listed on Euronext Paris and controlled by the French and English branch of the Rothschild family. Paris Orléans is the flagship of the Rothschild banking Group and controls the Rothschild Group's banking activities including N M Rothschild & Sons and Rothschild & Cie Banque. It has over 2,000 employees. Directors of the company include Eric de Rothschild, Robert de Rothschild and Count Philippe de Nicolay.

N M Rothschild & Sons, an English investment bank, does most of its business as an advisor for mergers and acquisitions. In 2004, the investment bank withdrew from the gold market, a commodity the Rothschild bankers had traded in for two centuries. In 2006, it ranked second in UK M&A with deals totalling $104.9 billion. In 2006, the bank recorded a pre-tax annual profit of £83.2 million with assets of £5.5 billion.

Edmond de Rothschild Group 

In 1953, one Swiss member of the family, Edmond Adolphe de Rothschild (1926–1997), founded the LCF Rothschild Group (now Edmond de Rothschild Group) which is based in Geneva, which today extends to 15 countries across the world. Although this Group is primarily a financial entity, specializing in asset management and private banking, its activities also cover mixed farming, luxury hotels and yacht racing. Edmond de Rothschild Group's committee is currently being chaired by Benjamin de Rothschild, Baron Edmond's son.

In late 2010, Baron Benjamin Rothschild said that the family had been unaffected by the financial crisis of 2007–2010, due to their conservative business practices: "We came through it well, because our investment managers did not want to put money into crazy things." He added that the Rothschilds were still a small-scale, traditional family business and took greater care over their clients' investments than American companies, adding: "The client knows we will not speculate with his money".

Edmond de Rothschild group includes these companies.
 Banque privée Edmond de Rothschild – Swiss private banking firm
 Compagnie Financière Edmond de Rothschild – French private bank
 La Compagnie Benjamin de Rothschild
 Cogifrance – Real estate
 Compagnie Vinicole Baron Edmond de Rothschild – wine making firm

RIT Capital Partners 
In 1980, Jacob Rothschild, 4th Baron Rothschild resigned from N M Rothschild & Sons and took independent control of Rothschild Investment Trust (now RIT Capital Partners, a British investment trust), which has reported assets of $3.4 billion in 2008. It is listed on London Stock Exchange. Lord Rothschild is also one of the major investors behind BullionVault, a gold trading platform.

In 2010 RIT Capital Partners stored a significant proportion of its assets in the form of physical gold. Other assets included oil and energy-related investments.

In 2012, RIT Capital Partners announced it is to buy a 37 per cent stake in a Rockefeller family wealth advisory and asset management group. Commenting on the deal, David Rockefeller, a former patriarch of the Rockefeller family, said: "The connection between our two families remains very strong."

Investments 
In 1991, Jacob Rothschild, 4th Baron Rothschild founded J. Rothschild Assurance Group (now St. James's Place Wealth Management) with Sir Mark Weinberg. It is also listed on London Stock Exchange.

In 2001, the Rothschild mansion located at 18 Kensington Palace Gardens, London, was on sale for £85 million, at that time (2001) the most expensive residential property ever to go on sale in the world. It was built in marble, at 9,000 sq ft, with underground parking for 20 cars.

In December 2009, Jacob Rothschild, 4th Baron Rothschild invested $200 million of his own money in a North Sea oil company.

In January 2010, Nathaniel Philip Rothschild bought a substantial share of the Glencore mining and oil company's market capitalisation. He also bought a large share of the aluminium mining company United Company RUSAL.

During the 19th century, the Rothschilds controlled the Rio Tinto mining corporation, and to this day, Rothschild and Rio Tinto maintain a close business relationship.

Wine 

The Rothschild family has been in the winemaking industry for 150 years. In 1853, Nathaniel de Rothschild purchased Château Brane-Mouton and renamed it Château Mouton Rothschild. In 1868, James Mayer de Rothschild purchased the neighbouring Château Lafite and renamed it Château Lafite Rothschild.

Today, the Rothschild family owns many wine estates: their estates in France include Château Clarke, Château de Malengin, Château Clerc-Milon, Château d'Armailhac, Château Duhart-Milon, Château Lafite Rothschild, Château de Laversine, Château des Laurets, Château L'Évangile, Château Malmaison, Château de Montvillargenne, Château Mouton Rothschild, Château de la Muette, Château Rieussec and Château Rothschild d'Armainvilliers. They also own wine estates across North America, South America, South Africa and Australia.

Especially, Château Mouton Rothschild and Château Lafite Rothschild are classified as Premier Cru Classé—i.e., First Growth, the status referring to a classification of wines from the Bordeaux region of France.

Saskia de Rothschild was named Chairwoman of Château Lafite Rothschild in 2018, succeeding her father, Éric de Rothschild. Château Mouton Rothschild was managed by Philippine de Rothschild until her death in 2014. It is now under the direction of her son Philippe Sereys de Rothschild.

Art and charity 
The family once had one of the largest private art collections in the world, and a significant proportion of the art in the world's public museums are Rothschild donations which were sometimes, in the family tradition of discretion, donated anonymously.

Hannah Mary Rothschild was appointed in December 2014 as chair of the Board of the National Gallery of London.

Cultural references 

In the words of The Daily Telegraph: "This multinational banking family is a byword for wealth, power – and discretion... The Rothschild name has become synonymous with money and power to a degree that perhaps no other family has ever matched."

Writing of the Rockefeller and Rothschild families, Harry Mount writes: "That is what makes these two dynasties so exceptional – not just their dizzying wealth, but the fact that they have held on to it for so long: and not just the loot, but also their family companies."

The story of the Rothschild family has been featured in a number of films. The 1934 Hollywood film titled The House of Rothschild, starring George Arliss and Loretta Young, recounted the life of Mayer Amschel Rothschild and Nathan Mayer Rothschild (both played by Arliss). Excerpts from this film were incorporated into the Nazi propaganda film Der ewige Jude (The Eternal Jew) without the permission of the copyright holder. Another Nazi film, Die Rothschilds (also called Aktien auf Waterloo), was directed by Erich Waschneck in 1940. A Broadway musical entitled The Rothschilds, covering the history of the family up to 1818, was nominated for a Tony Award in 1971. Nathaniel Mayer ("Natty") Rothschild, 1st Baron Rothschild appears as a minor character in the historical-mystery novel Stone's Fall, by Iain Pears. Mayer Rothschild is featured in Diana Gabaldon's novel Voyager as a coin seller summoned to Le Havre by Jamie Fraser to appraise coins, prior to the establishment of the Rothschild dynasty, when Mayer is in his early 20s. The Rothschild name is mentioned by Aldous Huxley in his novel Brave New World, among many names of historically affluent persons, scientific innovators and others. The character, named Morgana Rothschild, played a relatively minor role in the story. The name Rothschild used as a synonym for extreme wealth inspired the song "If I Were a Rich Man", which is based on a song from the Tevye the Dairyman stories, written in the Yiddish as Ven ikh bin Rotshild, meaning "If I were a Rothschild".

In France, the word "Rothschild" was throughout the 19th and 20th centuries a synonym for seemingly endless wealth, neo-Gothic styles, and epicurean glamour. The family also has lent its name to "," a suffocatingly glamorous style of interior decoration whose elements include neo-Renaissance palaces, extravagant use of velvet and gilding, vast collections of armour and sculpture, a sense of Victorian horror vacui, and the highest masterworks of art. Le goût Rothschild has much influenced designers such as Robert Denning, Yves Saint Laurent, Vincent Fourcade and others.

Conspiracy theories 

Over more than two centuries, the Rothschild family has frequently been the subject of conspiracy theories. These theories take differing forms, such as claiming that the family controls the world's wealth and financial institutions or encouraged or discouraged wars between governments. Discussing this and similar views, the historian Niall Ferguson wrote that, 

Many conspiracy theories about the Rothschild family arise from anti-Semitic prejudice and various antisemitic canards.

Prominent descendants of Mayer Amschel Rothschild 

Prominent lineal descendants of Mayer Amschel Rothschild include among many others:

 Major Alexander Karet (1905–1976)
 Adeleheid von Rothschild (1853–1935) x 1877 : Edmond de Rothschild (1845–1934) (see the Paris branch)
 Almina Herbert, Countess of Carnarvon (15 August 1876 – 8 May 1969)
 Prince Alexandre Louis Philippe Marie Berthier (1883–1918), died fighting in the First World War
 Albert Salomon von Rothschild (1844–1911), former majority shareholder of Creditanstalt
 Alfred Charles de Rothschild (20 July 1842 – 31 January 1918)
 Alice Charlotte von Rothschild (1847–1922) close friend of Queen Victoria
 Aline Caroline de Rothschild (1867–1909), French socialite
 Alice Rothschild (born 1983), wife of Zac Goldsmith, after his divorce of Sheherazade Ventura-Bentley
 Lady Aline Caroline Cholmondeley (born 1916)
 Baroness Afdera Franchetti (born c. 1931), a former wife of Henry Fonda, from the noble Italian Jewish Franchetti family
 Baroness Alix Hermine Jeannette Schey de Koromla (1911–1982)
 Alphonse James de Rothschild (1827–1905)
 Amschel Mayor James Rothschild (1955–1996, Paris), patron of motor racing
 Princess Andréa de La Tour d'Auvergne-Lauraguais (born Paris 1972)
 Anthony Gustav de Rothschild (1887–1961), horse-breeder
 Anthony James de Rothschild (born 1977)
 Anselm von Rothschild (1803–1874), Austrian banker
 Anselm Alexander Carl de Rothschild (1835–1854)
 Sir Anthony de Rothschild, 1st Baronet (1810–1876)
 Antoine Armand Odélric Marie Henri de Gramont, 13th Duke of Gramont (born 1951)
 Alain de Rothschild (1910–1982)
 Lady Barbara Marie-Louise Constance Berry (born 1935)
 Arthur de Rothschild (1851–1903)
 Benjamin de Rothschild (1963–2021)
 Princess Béatrice de Broglie (1913-1994)
 Béatrice Ephrussi de Rothschild (1864–1934)
 Bethsabée de Rothschild (1914–1999)
 Carl Mayer von Rothschild (1788–1855)
 Cécile Léonie Eugénie Gudule Lucie de Rothschild (1913–1995)
 Charlotte de Rothschild (1825-1899)
 Charlotte Henriette de Rothschild (born 1955), British opera singer
 Charlotte von Rothschild (1818–84)
 Count Charles-Emmanuel Lannes de Montebello (born 1942)
 Charles Rothschild (1877–1923), banker and entomologist
 Constance Flower, 1st Baroness of Battersea (1843–1931)
 David Cholmondeley, 7th Marquess of Cholmondeley (born 1960), Lord Great Chamberlain of England
 David Mayer de Rothschild (born 1978), billionaire British adventurer and environmentalist
 David René de Rothschild (born 1942)
 Edmond Adolphe de Rothschild (1926–1997)
 Edouard Etienne de Rothschild (born 1957)
 Édouard Alphonse James de Rothschild (1868–1949) financier and polo player
 Prince Edouard de La Tour d'Auvergne-Lauraguais (born 1949)
 Edmond James de Rothschild (1845–1934)
 Edmund Leopold de Rothschild (1916–2009)
 Elie de Rothschild (1917–2007)
 Princess Elisabeth de Broglie (born 1920)
 Emma Rothschild (born 1948)
 Esther de Rothschild (born 1979)
 Evelina de Rothschild (1839–66)
 Evelyn Achille de Rothschild (1886–1917), died fighting for the British Army in the First World War
 Sir Evelyn de Rothschild (1931–2022), banker
 Baron Ferdinand de Rothschild, M.P. (1839–1898)
 Count Gabriel Antoine Armand (1908–1943), a soldier of the French Resistance.
 Gustave Samuel de Rothschild (1829–1911)
 Guy de Rothschild (1909–2007)
 Hannah Primrose, Countess of Rosebery née Hannah Rothschild (1851–1890)
 Hannah Mary Rothschild (born 1962), documentary filmmaker
 Helene Cecile Muhlstein de Rothschild (1936–2007) x 1962 : François Nourissier (1927–2011), président de l'Académie Goncourt
 Henri James de Rothschild (1872–1946), playwright, grandson of Nathaniel de Rothschild
 Henry Herbert, 6th Earl of Carnarvon (1898–1987)
 Duke Hélie Marie Auguste Jacques Bertrand Philippe (1943), 10th Duke of Noailles
 Henriette Rothschild (1791–1866) married Sir Moses Montefiore (1784–1885)
 Count Henri de Gramont (1909–1994)
 Hugh Cholmondeley, 6th Marquess of Cholmondeley (1919–90), Lord Great Chamberlain of England
 Jacqueline de Rothschild (1911–2012) x (1) 1930; Robert Calmann-Lévy (1899–1982) puis x (2) 1937; Gregor Piatigorsky (1903–1976)
 James Amschel Victor Rothschild (born 1985)
 James Armand de Rothschild (1878–1957)
 James Mayer Rothschild (1792–1868)
 Joachim Von Rothschild (1929–1998)
 Marie Angliviel de la Beaumelle (1963–2013)
 Neil Primrose, 7th Earl of Rosebery (born 1929)
 Neil James Archibald Primrose (1882–1917), MP, killed fighting in the First World War
 Baroness Nica de Koenigswarter (née Baroness Pannonica Rothschild) (1913–1988), patron of bebop and jazz writer – often called the "Jazz Baroness"
 Baron Léon Lambert (1929–1987), Belgian art collector
 Leopold de Rothschild (1845–1917)
 Leopold David de Rothschild (1927–2012)
 Leonora de Rothschild (1837–1911)
 Lionel Nathan Rothschild (1808–1879)
 Louis Nathaniel de Rothschild (1882–1955)
 Lady Louise Rothschild (1821–1910), philanthropist and daughter of Henrietta Rothschild
 Countess Magdalene-Sophie von Attems (born 1927)
 Marie-Hélène de Rothschild (1927–94), French socialite
 Maurice de Rothschild (1881–1957)
 Mayer Amschel de Rothschild (1818–1874)
 Miriam Louisa Rothschild (1908–2005), famous entomologist and zoologist
 Lionel Walter Rothschild, 2nd Baron Rothschild, of Tring in the County of Hertford (1868–1937)
 Nathaniel de Rothschild (1812–1870)
 Nathan Mayer Rothschild (1777–1836)
 Nathan Mayer Rothschild, 1st Baron Rothschild, of Tring in the County of Hertford (1840–1915)
 Nathaniel Charles Jacob Rothschild, 4th Baron Rothschild, of Tring in the County of Hertford (born 1936)
 Nathaniel Robert de Rothschild (1946), French financier
 Nathaniel Mayer Victor Rothschild, 3rd Baron Rothschild, of Tring in the County of Hertford (1910–1990)
 Nathaniel Philip Rothschild (born 1971), a co-chairman of Atticus Capital, a £20 billion hedge fund
 Nathaniel Anselm von Rothschild (1836–1905), Austrian socialite
 Sir Philip Sassoon, 3rd Baronet (1888–1939), British First Commissioner of Works and Under-Secretary of State for Air
 Count Philippe de Nicolay (born 1955), great-grandson of Salomon James de Rothschild, he is a director of the Rothschild group.
 Robert de Rothschild (1880–1946) x 1907 : Gabrielle Beer (1886–1945)
 Philippe de Rothschild (1902–1988), vintner, son of Henri James de Rothschild
 Philippine de Rothschild (1935–2014), vintner, daughter of Philippe
 Jacqueline Rebecca Louise de Rothschild (1911–2012), chess and tennis champion
 Harry Primrose, 6th Earl of Rosebery (1882–1974) Earl of Roseberry
 Raphael de Rothschild (1976–2000)
 Salomon James de Rothschild (1835–1864)
 Lady Serena Dunn Rothschild (1935-2019)
 Countess Sophie von Löwenstein-Scharffeneck (1896–1978)
 Lady Sybil Grant (1879–1955), British writer
 Sybil Cholmondeley, Marchioness of Cholmondeley (1894–1989)
 Valentine Noémi von Springer (1886–1969)
 Victoria Katherine Rothschild (born 1953)
 Walter Rothschild, 2nd Baron Rothschild (1868–1937), zoologist
 Wilhelm Carl von Rothschild (1828–1901)

Prominent marriages into the family include, among many others:

 Maurice Ephrussi (1849–1916), of the Ephrussi family
 Ben Goldsmith (born 1980), son of financier James Goldsmith, of the Goldsmith family married Kate Emma Rothschild (born 1982)
 Anita Patience Guinness (1957), of the Guinness family, married Amschel Mayor James Rothschild
 Abraham Oppenheim (1804–1878), of the Oppenheim Family, married Charlotte Beyfus (1811–1887)
 Cora Guggenheim (1873–1956), of the Guggenheim family, married Louis F. Rothschild (1869–1957)
 Aline Caroline de Rothschild (1867–1909) married Edward Sassoon (1856–1912), of the Sassoon family
 Carola Warburg Rothschild (1894–1987), philanthropist, born into the Warburg family
 Sara Louise de Rothschild (born 1834), married the Baron Raimondo Franchetti (born 1829)
 Baron Eugéne Daniel de Rothschild (1884–1976) married Countess Cathleen Wolff de Schönborn-Bucheim (1885 – c. 1946)
 In 1923, James Nathaniel Charles Léopold Rothschild, son of Henri James Nathaniel Charles Rothschild and Mathilde Sophie Henriette de Weisweiller, married Claude du Pont of the Du Pont family.
 Bertha Clara de Rothschild (1862) married Prince Alexandre de Wagram
 Bertha Juliet de Rothschild (1870) married Baron Emmanuel Leonino
 Lili Jeanette von Goldschimdt-Rothschild (1883–1929), married Baron Philippe Schey de Koromla
 Elisabeth Pelletier de Chambure (1902–1945), the only member of the Rothschild family to die in the Holocaust.
 Antoine Agénor Armand (1879–1962), of the Naples Rothschild lines, married Countess Élaine Greffulhe, daughter of Princess Élisabeth de Caraman-Chimay
 Hannah Mayer Rothschild (1815–1864) married Hon. Henry Fitzroy (1807–1859), of the family of the Dukes of Grafton
 Edouard Alphonse James de Rothschild (1868–1949) married in 1905 the Baroness Alice Germaine de Helphen (1884–1979)
 Count François de Nicolay (1919–1963), of the House of Nicolay, married Marie-Hélène Naila Stephanie Josina van Zuylen van Nyevelt
 Marguerite de Rothschild in 1878 married Antoine Alfred Agénor, 11th Duc de Gramont (1851–1921),
 Dorothy de Rothschild (1895–1988), on her death she left the largest probated estate in Britain
 George Herbert, 5th Earl of Carnarvon married Almina Victoria Maria Alexandra Wombwell, the illegitimate daughter of Alfred de Rothschild
 Pauline de Rothschild (1908–1976), fashion designer and translator of Elizabethan poetry
 , of the Wodehouse family
 Louis Philippe Marie Alexandre Berthier, 3rd Prince of Wagram (1836–1911)
 Countess Katharina Eleonore Veronika Irma Luise Henckel von Donnersmarck (1902–1965), actress, married Baron Erich von Goldschmidt-Rothschild
 Amartya Sen (born 1933), Nobel Laureate, Indian economist and philosopher, married Emma Georgina Rothschild of the Rothschild banking family of England.
 Jeanne de Rothschild (1908–2003), actress
 Nadine de Rothschild (1932–), French actress and author
 Princess Sophie de Ligne (born 1957), of the House of Ligne, married Philippe de Nicolay (born 1955), a director of the Rothschild group, and the great-grandson of Salomon James de Rothschild
 Liliane de Rothschild (1916–2003, née Fould-Springer), art collector
 David René de Rothschild married Princess Olimpia Anna Aldobrandini, of the House of Borghese and the House of Bonaparte.
 Baron Robert Philippe de Rothschild married Nelly Beer, a great-grand-niece of Giacomo Meyerbeer
 Richard Francis Roger Yarde-Buller, 4th Baron Churston of Churston Ferrers and Lupton (1910–1991), married Olga Alice Muriel Rothschild
 Serena Dunn Rothschild (1935-2019), granddaughter of Sir James Hamet Dunn, 1st Baronet
 Lynn Forester de Rothschild (born 1954), businesswoman
 Edward Maurice Stonor (1885–1930), son of Francis Stonor, 4th Baron Camoys
 Lady Pamela Wellesley Grant (born 1912), great-great-granddaughter of the Duke of Wellington, married Lieutenant Charles Robert Archibald Grant, great-great-grandson of Mayer Amschel de Rothschild
 Baroness Rozsika Edle von Wertheimstein
 Baron Etienne van Zuylen van Nyevelt of the House of Van Zuylen van Nyevelt – married Baroness Hélène de Rothschild (1863–1947).
 Baron Sigismund von Springer (1873–1927), married Baroness Valentine Noémi von Rothschild (1886–1969), after whom the asteroid 703 Noëmi is named
 In 1943 Baron Elie Robert de Rothschild (1917–2007), married Lady Liliane Elisabeth Victoire Fould-Springer, great-aunt of actress Helena Bonham Carter
 In 2015, James Rothschild married American heiress and socialite Nicky Hilton, the great-granddaughter of Hilton Hotels founder Conrad Hilton

Coat of arms

See also 

 List of European Jewish nobility
 List of wealthiest families
 Ascott House
 Avenue Foch
 Cecil John Rhodes
 Château de Montvillargenne
 Château de Pregny
 Château Lafite Rothschild
 Château Mouton Rothschild
 De Beers
 Eramet
 Genealogy of the Rothschild family
 Goût Rothschild
 Hôtel de Marigny
 Hôtel Salomon de Rothschild
 Hôtel Lambert
 The House of Rothschild (1934 film), addresses Rothschild roles in the Napoleonic era
 Imerys
 Napoleonic Wars
 Old money
 Palais Rothschild
 Rockefeller family
 Rothschild Island
 Rothschild (Fabergé egg)
 Rothschild properties in and around Buckinghamshire
 Rio Tinto Mining Group
 Vaux-de-Cernay Abbey
 Warburg family

Notes

References

Further reading 
 Niall Ferguson: The House of Rothschild: Money's Prophets, 1798–1848
 Niall Ferguson: The House of Rothschild: The World's Banker, 1849–1998
 Frederic Morton: The Rothschilds: Portrait of a Dynasty
 Amos Elon: Founder: A Portrait of the First Rothschild and His Time, 1996.
 Egon Caesar Conte Corti: Rise of the House of Rothschild, B. Lunn (translator), Books for Business 2001 (reprint of 1928 translation published by Gollancz), Amazon.co.uk searchable online view
 Joseph Valynseele & Henri-Claude Mars, Le Sang des Rothschild, ICC Editions, Paris [fr]. 2004
 Derek A. Wilson: Rothschild: A Story of Wealth and Power
 Mir-Babayev M.F.: The role of Azerbaijan in the World's oil industry – "Oil-Industry History" (USA), 2011, v. 12, no. 1, p. 109–123.
 Mir-Babayev M.F.: The Rothschild brother's contribution to Baku's oil industry – "Oil-Industry History" (USA), 2012, v. 13, no. 1, p. 225–236.
 Pietro Ratto: I Rothschild e gli altri. Dal governo del mondo all'indebitamento delle nazioni: i segreti delle famiglie più potenti, Arianna Editrice, Bologna [it]. 2015
 William Verity: The Rise of the Rothschilds – "History Today" (April 19680, Vol. 18 Issue 4, p225-233. covers 1770 to 1839.

Documentary film 
 The Ascent of Money: A Financial History of the World – The early history of the Rothschild's family business feature in the second of a four-part series by Niall Ferguson aired on Channel Four

External links 

History
 Rothschild Archive
 The article of "Rothschild" in Jewish Encyclopedia
 

Foundations
 The Edmond de Rothschild Foundations
 The Rothschild Foundation

 
American bankers
American people of German-Jewish descent
American real estate businesspeople
Austrian bankers
Banking families
Business families of the United States
English bankers
French bankers
German bankers
History of banking
Italian bankers
Jewish American art collectors
Jewish-American families
Jewish American philanthropists
Jewish-German families
Swiss bankers
Free City of Frankfurt